The 2011 7-Dorpenomloop Aalburg, also known as the Verti advies 7-Dorpenomloop van Aalburg due to sponsorships reasons, was the fifth running of the women's 7-Dorpenomloop Aalburg, an elite women's bicycle race in Aalburg, the Netherlands. It was rated by the UCI as a 1.2 category race. It was the first year that the race was a UCI 1.2 category race, so it was also the first year that the race was part of the 2011 UCI women's cycling calendar.

Results

s.t. = same time
Sources

References

External links
  

7-Dorpenomloop Aalburg
2011 in Dutch sport
2011 in women's road cycling